Mihailo Pavićević (born March 15, 1958) is a Montenegrin professional basketball coach and former player. He currently works as the head coach for Mornar of the Montenegrin Basketball League and the ABA League.

Playing career 
Pavićević has spent most of his playing career in his native Bar playing for the local team Mornar. On two occasions he played for Budućnost in Podgorica, and he ended his playing career in Omonia Nicosia.

Coaching career 
Pavićević started coaching in 1989 in Mornar, before moving to the Crvena zvezda in 1996. With the Zvezda he won the YUBA League championship in the 1997–98 season.

Between 2000 and 2009, Pavićević led Espoon Honka and won five Finnish championships and two Finnish Cups. He managed to promote several important Finnish players, such as Petteri Koponen, Kimmo Muurinen, and others.

In 2013, Pavićević became the coach of the Chinese club Liaoning Flying Leopards, with whom he had managed to qualify for the playoff finals in the 2014–15 season where they lost from the Beijing Ducks.

Prior to the 2017–18 season, Pavićević became the head coach for Mornar.

National team coaching career 
Between 2011 and 2014, Pavićević was the head coach of the Montenegro national under-20 team.

Personal life 
His brother is Đorđije Pavićević, a basketball coach and former head coach of Mornar.

His daughter Tamara Pavićević is a fashion blogger.

Career achievements 
As head coach
 Montenegrin League champion: 1  (with Mornar Bar: 2017–18) 
 YUBA League champion: 1  (with Crvena zvezda: 1997–98)
 Finnish League champion: 5  (with Espoon Honka: 2000–01, 2001–02, 2002–03, 2006–07, 2007–08)
 Finnish Cup winner: 2  (with Espoon Honka: 2000–01, 2008–09)

Individual
 Finnish League Coach of the Year – 2003

See also 
 List of KK Crvena zvezda head coaches

References

1958 births
Living people
Guards (basketball)
KK Budućnost players
KK Crvena zvezda head coaches
KK Crvena zvezda assistant coaches
KK Mornar Bar players
KK Mornar Bar coaches
Montenegrin basketball coaches
Montenegrin expatriate basketball people in Serbia
Montenegrin men's basketball players
People from Bar, Montenegro
Yugoslav basketball coaches
Yugoslav men's basketball players